Events in 2000 in animation.



Events

January
 January 1: The website Homestar Runner goes up. Happy Tree Friends (Spin Fun Knowing Ya) has a premiere at a film festival for the first time during the turn of the millennium. Over a week after it's Internet debut.
 January 6: The film Cóndor Crux, la leyenda premiers.
 January 14: The Simpsons receive a star at the Hollywood Walk of Fame.
 January 23: The Simpsons episode "The Mansion Family" premieres, guest starring Britney Spears.

February
 February 6: The Walt Disney Company releases The Tigger Movie. 
 February 13: The Simpsons episode "Alone Again, Natura-Diddily" premieres, where the character Maude Flanders dies.
 February 20: The Futurama episode "The Lesser of Two Evils" premieres, guest-starring game show host Bob Barker.
 February 26: The first episode of The Weekenders airs.
 February 27: The Futurama episode "Raging Bender" premieres, guest-starring actor and impressionist Rich Little.
 February 29: The Walt Disney Company releases An Extremely Goofy Movie.

March
 March 9–28: The animated TV series God, the Devil and Bob is first broadcast, but was cancelled after four episodes over its satirical portrayal of God and Satan.
 March 19: The Simpsons episode "Bart to the Future" premieres. It has a throwaway joke about Donald Trump being President of the United States in the future and causing a budget crisis, which gained more attention when Trump became president and the episode was accused of unintentionally predicting the future. 
 March 26: 72nd Academy Awards: 
 The Old Man and the Sea by Alexander Petrov wins the Academy Award for Best Animated Short Film.
 You'll Be in My Heart from Tarzan by Phil Collins wins the Academy Award for Best Original Song.
 March 31: The Road to El Dorado premieres.

April
 April 1: Cartoon Network's sister channel Boomerang launches.
 April 2: The Futurama episode "How Hermes Requisitioned His Groove Back" premieres, guest-starring actress Nora Dunn.
 April 3: The first episode of Between the Lions airs.
 April 5: In the South Park episode "The Tooth Fairy's Tats 2000" Timmy Burch makes his debut.
 April 9: The Simpsons episode "Days of Wine and D'oh'ses" premieres, wherein the alcoholic character Barney Gumble becomes and stays sober.
 April 16: The Futurama episode "The Deep South" premieres, guest-starring musician and songwriter Donovan and actress Parker Posey.

May
 May 19: The Walt Disney Company releases Dinosaur. 
 May 21:
 The Simpsons episode "Behind the Laughter" premieres.
 The Futurama episode "Anthology of Interest I" premieres, guest-starring vice president Al Gore, Dungeons & Dragons creator Gary Gygax, physicist Stephen Hawking and actress Nichelle Nichols.
 May 22: Cartoon Network Studios opened in Burbank, California.

June
 June 16: Don Bluth and Gary Goldman's Titan A.E. is released, but becomes a box office flop, gaining $36.8 million against a $75–90 million budget and resulting in a $100 million loss for 20th Century Fox. Due to the failure of the film, Fox Animation Studios was shut down afterward.
 June 23: Peter Lord and Nick Park's Chicken Run premiers. It's the first feature-length film of Aardman Animation.

July
 July 7: June Foray receives a star on the Hollywood Walk of Fame.
 July 10: The film Heavy Metal 2000, a sequel to the 1981 film Heavy Metal, is released.
 July 22: The film The Boy Who Saw the Wind premiers.
 July 25: Don Hertzfeldt's Rejected premiers.
 July 29: The film Blood: The Last Vampire premiers at the 5th annual International Festival of Fantasy, Action and Genre Cinema, nicknamed Fantasia 2000, in Montreal. The film airs in Australia on August 26, 2000 at the Sydney 2000 Olympic Arts Festival. It makes its theatrical debut in its home country of Japan on November 16, 2000.

August
 August 14: The first episode of Dora the Explorer airs.
 August 18: The pilot episode of Sheep in the Big City is broadcast.
 August 26: The pilot episode of Generation O! is broadcast.
 August 29: Monster Mash is first released.

September
 September 3: The first episode of Playboy's Dark Justice, a computer-animated pornographic series, is broadcast.
 September 4: The first episode of Clifford the Big Red Dog airs.
 September 9:
 The first episode of Jackie Chan Adventures airs, an animated TV series based on martial arts actor Jackie Chan.
 The first episode of Teacher's Pet is broadcast.
 September 15: The film Titanic: The Legend Goes On is released. It would later gain notoriety for its low quality and rapping dog character.
 September 18: The Walt Disney Company announces they would be selling DIC Entertainment through a management buyout backed up through Bain Capital.
 September 23: The first episode of Static Shock airs.

October
 October 2: The first episode of Buzz Lightyear of Star Command airs.
 October 5: The first episode of Pelswick airs, based on John Callahan's cartoons.
 October 6: 
 Digimon: The Movie premiers.
 Help! I'm a Fish is first released. 
 October 21: The film Ah! My Goddess: The Movie is released.
 October 25: The first episode of As Told by Ginger airs. 
 October 27: Pettson och Findus - Kattonauten, based on the Pettson and Findus book series, is released.
 October 31: The film Gen¹³ is released.
 Specific date unknown: The film Vampire Hunter D: Bloodlust is released.

November
 November 5: The Simpsons episode "A Tale of Two Springfields" premieres, guest starring The Who.
 November 7: The film Joseph: King of Dreams is released, a sequel to The Prince of Egypt.
 November 14: 3-2-1 Penguins! is released in direct-to-video format.

December
 December 3: The Futurama episode "The Cryonic Woman" premieres, guest-starring comedian Pauly Shore and actress and comedian Sarah Silverman.
 December 7: The SpongeBob SquarePants holiday special episode "Christmas Who?", premieres on Nickelodeon.
 December 12: Batman Beyond: Return of the Joker is released, which causes controversy over The Joker's death scene. The full uncut version is only released on April 23, 2002. 
 December 14: The film The Magic Pudding is first released.
 December 15: The Walt Disney Company releases The Emperor's New Groove.  
 December 23: Pandavas: The Five Warriors, the first Indian computer animated film, is released. 
 December 27: Let's All Go to the Lobby and Porky in Wackyland are added to the National Film Registry.

Specific date unknown
 Per Åhlin's The Dog Hotel is first released.
 Michaël Dudok de Wit's Father and Daughter is first released.

Films released

 January 6 - Condor Crux, the Legend (Spain and Argentina)
 January 26 - Princes and Princesses (France)
 February 11:
 Circleen: Mice and Romance (Denmark)
 The Tigger Movie (United States and Japan)
 February 18 - Sinbad: Beyond the Veil of Mists (India and United States)
 February 21 - Soreike! Anpanman: Kieta Jam Oji-san (Japan)
 February 29 - An Extremely Goofy Movie (United States)
 March 4:
 Doraemon: Nobita and the Legend of the Sun King (Japan)
 One Piece: The Movie (Japan)
 March 10 - Hundhotellet (Sweden)
 March 11 -  The Great Easter Egg Hunt (United States)
 March 31: 
 The Road to El Dorado (United States)
 The Miracle Maker (Russia and United Kingdom)
 April 1 - VeggieTales: King George and the Ducky (United States)
 April 4 - Tom Sawyer (United States)
 April 22:
 Case Closed: Captured in Her Eyes (Japan)
 Crayon Shin-chan: Rumble in the Jungle (Japan)
 May 19 - Dinosaur (United States)
 May 24 - The New Bremen Musicians (Russia)
 May 26 - Odwrocona gora albo film pod strasznym tytułem (Poland)
 June 13 - Aladdin and the Adventure of All Time (United States and Philippines)
 June 16 - Titan A.E. (United States)
 June 23 - Chicken Run (United Kingdom and United States)
 June 24 - Escaflowne (Japan)
 June 30 - The Adventures of Rocky and Bullwinkle (United States)
 July - Vampire Hunter D: Bloodlust (Japan)
 July 6 - Heart, the Joys of Pantriste (Argentina)
 July 8 - Pokemon 3: The Movie Entei-Spell of the Unknown (Japan)
 July 10 - Heavy Metal 2000 (Canada and Germany)
 July 13 - The Rescue by Pintin (Argentina)
 July 14 - Leif Erickson, Discoverer of North America (United States)
 July 15 - Cardcaptor Sakura Movie 2: The Sealed Card (Japan)
 July 22 - The Boy Who Saw the Wind (Japan)
 July 28 - Lupin III: Missed by a Dollar (Japan)
 July 29 - Soreike! Anpanman Ningyohime no Namida (Japan)
 August 8 - Buzz Lightyear of Star Command: The Adventure Begins (United States)
 August 22 - The Scarecrow (United States)
 August 25 - Lion of Oz (Canada, United Kingdom and United States)
 August 27 - Is It Fall Yet? (United States and South Korea)
 August 29:
 Alvin and the Chipmunks Meet the Wolfman (United States)
 Monster Mash (Italy and United States)
 August 31 - Street Fighter Alpha: The Animation (Japan)
 September 12 - Tweety's High-Flying Adventure (United States)
 September 15 - Titanic: The Legend Goes On (Italy)
 September 19 - The Little Mermaid II: Return to the Sea (United States)
 September 30 - VeggieTales: Esther... The Girl Who Became Queen (United States)
 October 2 - The Island of the Crab (Spain)
 October 3 - Scooby-Doo and the Alien Invaders (United States)
 October 6:
 CyberWorld (United States)
 Digimon: The Movie (Japan and United States)
 Help! I'm a Fish (Germany, Ireland, and Denmark)
 October 17 - Franklin and the Green Knight (Canada)
 October 21 - Ah! My Goddess: The Movie (Japan)
 October 27 - Pettson och Findus – Kattonauten (Sweden)
 October 31:
 Casper's Haunted Christmas (Canada)
 The Life & Adventures of Santa Claus (United States)
 November 7 - Joseph: King of Dreams (United States)
 November 11 - The Tangerine Bear (United States)
 November 14 - Miracle in Toyland (United States)
 November 17 - Rugrats in Paris: The Movie (United States and Germany)
 November 18 - Blood: The Last Vampire (Japan)
 November 27 - Prop and Berta (Denmark and Latvia)
 December 1 - Marco Antonio, rescate en Hong Kong (Spain)
 December 5:
 The Land Before Time VII: The Stone of Cold Fire (United States)
 The Last Mystery of the 20th Century (Japan)
 December 10 - The Emperor's New Groove (United States)
 December 12 - Batman Beyond: Return of the Joker (United States)
 December 14 - The Magic Pudding (Australia)
 December 15 - The Thief of Dreams (Spain)
 December 20 - One Piece TV Special: Adventure in the Ocean's Navel (Japan)
 December 21 - Beauty and Warrior (Indonesia)
 December 23 - Pandavas: The Five Warriors (Russia)
 December 30 - Pokémon: Mewtwo Returns (Japan)
 Specific date unknown:
 Alpamysh (Uzbekistan)
 Duck Ugly (France and Ireland)
 The Four Seasons (Hungary)
 Jesus: A Kingdom Without Frontiers (Italy)
 Lotte's Journey South (Estonia)
 Nien Resurrection (Malaysia)
 Optimus Mundus (Russia)
 The Prince of Dinosaurs (Italy)
 Read or Die (Japan)
 Redwall: The Movie (Canada)
 Robin and the Dreamweavers (United States)

Television series debuts

Television series endings

Births

January
 January 7: Marcus Scribner, American actor (voice of Buck in The Good Dinosaur, Smudge in Home: Adventures with Tip & Oh, Bow in She-Ra and the Princesses of Power, Alex in Ron's Gone Wrong, D'Angelo Baker in Dragons: The Nine Realms, Movie Goer in the American Dad! episode "Garfield and Friends").
 January 8: Noah Cyrus, American singer, songwriter, and actress (voice of the title character in Ponyo, Kid in The Emperor's New School episode "Guaka Rules").

February
 February 5: Jordan Nagai, American former child actor (voice of Russell in Up, Charlie in The Simpsons episode "O Brother, Where Bart Thou?").
 February 10: Yara Shahidi, American actress (voice of Brenda in Smallfoot, Kendra Wilson in PAW Patrol: The Movie).

March
 March 6: Jacob Bertrand, American actor (voice of Monty in Rise of the Guardians,  Bam in Batwheels, young Noatak in The Legend of Korra episode "Skeletons in the Closet", Chama in The Lion Guard episode "Rafiki's New Neighbors").

May
 May 18: Addison Holley, Canadian actress (voice of Owlette in PJ Masks, Lili in My Big Big Friend, Miss Elaina in Daniel Tiger's Neighborhood, the title character in Ella the Elephant, Kate Persky in Grojband, Katie in Wild Kratts, Julia and The Cheetah in PAW Patrol, Tessa in Peg + Cat, Bianca in Wishenpoof!, Hazel in Little Charmers, Jessica Beeker in The ZhuZhus, Alice in the Doodlebops Rockin' Road Show episode "The Trumpet That Roared", Layla in the Caillou episode "The New Girl", Sally in the Monster Math Squad episode "Special Delivery").

June
 June 2: Lilimar Hernandez, American actress (voice of Solana in Spirit Riding Free, Cleopatra in Cleopatra in Space, Jeff in Batwheels).

July
 July 16: Jonathan Morgan Heit, American former actor (voice of Weston the Elf in Holly and Hal Moose: Christmas Adventure, Cubby in seasons 1-3 of Jake and the Never Land Pirates, Kip Supernova in Escape from Planet Earth).
 July 25: Meg Donnelly, American actress (voice of Supergirl in Legion of Super-Heroes, Scream in the Spider-Man episode "Maximum Venom").

August
 August 3: 
 Chandler Kinney, American actress and singer (voice of Tammy Myers in The Ghost and Molly McGee, Buttercup in Robot Chicken).
 Landry Bender, American actress (voice of Makini in The Lion Guard, Little Sister in Jake and the Never Land Pirates episode "The Singing Stones").

September
 September 1: Jacob Ewaniuk, Canadian actor (voice of Nick in seasons 1 and 2 of The Cat in the Hat Knows a Lot About That!, Catboy in season 1 of PJ Masks, continued voice of Timmy Tibble in Arthur).
 September 4: Ruby Stokes, English actress (voice of Kitty in Where is Anne Frank).
 September 28: Frankie Jonas, American former child actor (voice of Sōsuke in Ponyo).

October
 October 14: Mekai Curtis, American actor (voice of Zack Underwood in Milo Murphy's Law, Fuhara in The Lion Guard episode "Rafiki's New Neighbors").
 October 16: David Rawle, Irish actor (voice of Ben in Song of the Sea).
 October 31: Willow Smith, American singer-songwriter and actress (voice of Unica in We Baby Bears, Abby in Merry Madagascar, young Gloria in Madagascar: Escape 2 Africa, Beth in the Adventure Time episode "Come Along with Me").

November
 November 15: Coco Grayson, American actress (voice of Princess Hildegard in Sofia the First, Maynar in Lego Star Wars: The Freemaker Adventures).
 November 22: Auli'i Cravalho, American actress and singer (voice of Moana in Moana and Ralph Breaks the Internet).

December
 December 22: Joshua Bassett, American actor, singer and songwriter (voice of Nick Daley in Night at the Museum: Kahmunrah Rises Again).

Deaths

January
 January 7: Bob McFadden, American actor (voice of Franken Berry in the Monster Cereals, the title character in Cool McCool, Jingle Bells in The Year Without a Santa Claus, Snarf in ThunderCats), dies at age 76.
 January 12: Marc Davis, American animator and character designer (Walt Disney Animation Studios), dies at age 86.

February
 February 10: Jim Varney, American actor and comedian (voice of Slinky Dog in Toy Story and Toy Story 2, Cookie in Atlantis: The Lost Empire, Mr. Gus Holder in Annabelle's Wish, Walt Evergreen in the Duckman episode "You've Come a Wrong Way, Baby", Cooder in The Simpsons episode "Bart Carny", Ephialtes in the Hercules episode "Hercules and the Muse of Dance"), dies at age 50.
 February 12: Charles M. Schulz, American cartoonist (creator of Peanuts), dies at age 77.
 February 13: J. Robert Harris, American composer (theme from Spider-Man), dies at age 74.
 February 23: Ofra Haza, Israeli singer, actress, recording artist, writer and journalist (voice of Yocheved and performed the song "Deliver Us" in The Prince of Egypt), dies at age 42.

March
 March 3: Nicole Van Goethem, Belgian cartoonist, animator and film director (A Greek Tragedy), dies at the age of 58.
 March 6: John Colicos, Canadian actor (voice of Apocalypse in X-Men), dies at age 71.
 March 13: Rex Everhart, American actor (voice of Maurice in Beauty and the Beast), dies at age 79.
 March 16: Stanley Ralph Ross, American writer (Wait Till Your Father Gets Home, G.I. Joe: A Real American Hero), and actor (voice of Gorilla Grodd and Brainiac in Super Friends), dies at age 64.
 March 24: Kazuo Komatsubara, Japanese animator, character designer and director (Toei Animation, Oh! Production), dies at age 59.

April
 April 3: Félix Nakamura, Peruvian animator and film director, dies from cancer at age 59.

May
 May 9: Arthur Davis, American animator and film director (Charles B. Mintz, Warner Bros. Cartoons, Walter Lantz, Hanna-Barbera, DePatie-Freleng Enterprises), dies at age 94.

June
 June 1: Tito Puente, American musician, songwriter, bandleader and record producer (voiced himself in The Simpsons episode "Who Shot Mr. Burns?"), dies from a heart attack at age 77.
 June 13: Yefim Gamburg, Russian animated film director (Passion of Spies,  Ograblenie po..., Blue Puppy, Dog in Boots), dies at age 75.
 June 30: Robert L. Manahan, American actor (second voice of Zordon in Power Rangers) and re-recording mixer (McGee and Me!, Beakman's World, Mighty Morphin Power Rangers, King of the Hill, Dilbert), dies at age 43.

July
 July 14: Meredith MacRae, American actress (voice of Francine Langstrom in Batman: The Animated Series, Rachel Quest in Jonny's Golden Quest), dies at age 56.
 July 20: Eyvind Earle, American artist, author and illustrator (Walt Disney Animation Studios), dies at age 84.

August
 August 8: Glenn Schmitz, American animator and comics artist (Walt Disney Animation, Hanna-Barbera, Ruby-Spears), dies at age 70.
 August 24: Tatiana Riabouchinska, Russian ballerina (Fantasia, Make Mine Music), dies at age 83.
 August 25: Carl Barks, American animator and comics artist (Walt Disney Company), dies at age 99.
 August 27: Ante Zaninovic, Croatian animator, film director and comics artist (Professor Balthazar), dies at age 65.

September
 September 3: Walt Stanchfield, American animator, writer and teacher (Walt Disney Studios), dies at age 81.
 September 10:
 Ben Wicks, English-born Canadian cartoonist, illustrator, journalist and author (co-creator of Katie and Orbie), dies from cancer at age 73.
 Lester Novros, American artist, animator, and teacher, dies at age 91.
 September 13: Rolf Kauka, German comics artist and film director (Fix and Foxi), dies at age 83.
 September 26: Richard Mulligan, American actor (voice of Einstein in Oliver & Company, Old Gramps in The Angry Beavers episode "Fish and Dips", Jimmy Kafka in the Hey Arnold! episode "Old Iron Man"), dies from colon cancer at age 67.

October
 October 16: Ed Nofziger, American animator and comics artist (UPA), dies at age 87.
 October 30: Steve Allen, American television personality, radio personality, musician, composer, actor, comedian and writer (voice of Bart Simpson's Electronically Altered Voice in The Simpsons episode "Separate Vocations", himself in The Critic episode "A Day at the Races and a Night at the Opera", The Simpsons episode "'Round Springfield", and the Pinky and the Brain episode "The Pinky and the Brain Reunion Special"), dies from hemopericardium at age 78.

November
 November 1: Bernard Erhard, American actor (voice of Cy-Kill in Challenge of the GoBots, Timber Smurf in The Smurfs, Cryotek in Visionaries: Knights of the Magical Light, King Morpheus in Little Nemo: Adventures in Slumberland, Wolf in Rover Dangerfield), dies at age 66.
 November 16: Joe C., American rapper and musician (voice of Kidney Rock in Osmosis Jones, and himself in The Simpsons episode "Kill the Alligator and Run"), dies from celiac disease at age 26.
 November 20: Vyacheslav Kotyonochkin, Russian animator and comics artist (Nu, pogodi!, aka Well, Just You Wait!), dies at age 73.
 November 28: Robert Bentley, American animator (Warner Bros. Cartoons, Fleischer Studios, MGM, Walter Lantz Productions, UPA, Hanna-Barbera, Filmation), dies at age 93.

December
 December 3: Hoyt Curtin, American composer (Hanna-Barbera), dies at age 78.
 December 6: Werner Klemperer, German-American actor, stage entertainer and singer (voice of Haman in The Greatest Adventure: Stories from the Bible episode "Queen Esther", Colonel Klink in The Simpsons episode "The Last Temptation of Homer"), dies from cancer at age 80.
 December 18: Nick Stewart, American actor (voice of Specks Crow in Dumbo and Br'er Bear in Song of the South), dies at age 90.
 December 23: Billy Barty, American actor (voice of Figment in Language Arts Through Imagination, Dweedle in Wildfire Baitmouse in The Rescuers Down Under, and Hips McManus in The New Batman Adventures episode "Double Talk"), dies at age 76.

Specific date unknown
 Storm de Hirsch, American poet, film director and animator (Peyote Queen), dies at age 87 or 88.
 Meliza Espinosa, Canadian character designer (DIC Entertainment, Werner, Jungle Cubs, Timon & Pumbaa), dies at an unknown age.

See also
2000 in anime

References

External links 
Animated works of the year, listed in the IMDb

 
2000s in animation